"Not Enough Indians" is a song written by Baker Knight, which was released in 1968 by Dean Martin. The song spent 9 weeks on the Billboard Hot 100 chart, peaking at No. 43, while reaching No. 4 on Billboards Easy Listening chart, No. 49 on Canada's RPM 100, and No. 18 on Australia's Go-Set National Top 40.

Chart performance

References

1968 singles
1968 songs
Dean Martin songs
Reprise Records singles
Song recordings produced by Jimmy Bowen
Songs written by Baker Knight